XHARO-FM is a community radio station in Ciudad Nezahualcóyotl, State of Mexico, broadcasting on 104.5 FM. The permit for the station is held by Radio Aro, A.C., and the station is known as Radio Rélax. XHARO is a member of AMARC México.

History
The station signed on in March 2010 after soliciting a permit late in 2008.

Notes

References

Radio stations in the State of Mexico
Community radio stations in Mexico
Radio stations established in 2010